Absent Elk are a British pop rock band who formed in 2008. They have released two singles to date, and released their first album in October 2009. Their cover version of Girls Aloud's "The Loving Kind", which was posted on YouTube, became a small phenomenon and led to them being invited to support Girls Aloud on the first leg of their Out of Control Tour in spring 2009. The band's name comes from their Norwegian influence, as the band's lead vocalist, Kjetil Mørland, is from Norway, whom he represented at the Eurovision Song Contest 2015 alongside Debrah Scarlett.

History
In 2008, the band supported headlining acts The Script and The Hoosiers, and in 2009 they were invited to support Girls Aloud on the aforementioned tour. The band released "Sun & Water" in May 2009 and toured the UK the following month. Their debut album, Caught in the Headlights, was released in October 2008.

Discography

Singles

Albums

Band members
Kjetil Mørland – Vocals, Acoustic Guitar
Ric Wilson – Drums, Backing Vocals
James Penhallow – Bass
Ross Martin – Guitar, Keyboard
Mike Hillman – Guitar, Backing Vocals

References

External links
 Official site 

British indie rock groups
Musical groups established in 2008